Melvin Oliver may refer to:
 Melvin Oliver (American football), American football defensive end
 Melvin L. Oliver, American academic administrator and professor
 Sy Oliver (Melvin James Oliver), American jazz arranger, trumpeter and bandleader